The Long Beach Motorsports Walk of Fame is a walk of fame located on South Pine Avenue in the downtown waterfront area of Long Beach, California, to recognize those who have made a major contribution to auto racing in Long Beach. The project was conceived in late 2005 through talks between the Economic Development Bureau of the City of Long Beach and officials in order to improve and strengthen the city's ties with the open-wheel car racing event, the Grand Prix of Long Beach. It earned support from elected officials, local government and business and auto racing enthusiasts, and was officially dedicated in a ceremony led by Beverly O'Neill, the Long Beach mayor, on April 6, 2006. The Redevelopment Agency of Long Beach provided development funding for the Walk of Fame, and the project set out to inform the public about Long Beach's contribution to auto racing.

Each year, two or three auto racing figures are inducted following a vote by an informal group of individuals such as local officials and Long Beach Grand Prix Association members. A  bronze medallion plaque,  depicting a rendition of each inductee's car and listing their greatest achievements in auto racing, is permanently embedded in the palm-lined concrete sidewalk. The medallions proceed up the sidewalk's center alongside the Grand Prix of Long Beach race circuit in front of the Long Beach Convention Center. Mark Vaughn of Autoweek described it as "a venue somewhat similar to the Hollywood Walk of Fame".

A total of 35 people from the world of motorsports have been inducted since 2006. The two inaugural members, Dan Gurney and Phil Hill, were inducted in 2006. All but twelve inductees are from the United States. In 2019, Sébastien Bourdais and Will Power were the first two active IndyCar Series participants to be added to the Walk of Fame. Only one person has been posthumously inducted, Gary Gabelich, the former world land speed record holder in 2008. There have been three racing teams added to the Walk of Fame. In 2007, Newman/Haas Racing, who were considered one of the most successful squads in Long Beach Grand Prix history, became the first team added to the Walk of Fame; the two other teams are Chip Ganassi Racing, inducted in 2011, and Galles Racing, who was added the following year. Bruce Flanders, Gerald Forsythe, Kevin Kalkhoven, Roger Penske and Christopher Pook are the five non-drivers who are members of the Walk of Fame. The two most recent inductees were Bill Auberlen and Alex Zanardi in 2022.

Inductees

By nationality

See also
 International Motorsports Hall of Fame
 Motorsports Hall of Fame of America

Notes

References

External links
 

Tourist attractions in Long Beach, California
Auto racing museums and halls of fame
Walks of fame
Halls of fame in California